George A. Hamid may refer to:
George A. Hamid Sr. (1896–1971), entrepreneur in the American outdoor amusement and entertainment industry
George A. Hamid Jr. (1918–2013), his son, entrepreneur in the American outdoor amusement and entertainment industry